The 1998 Sun Belt Conference men's basketball tournament was held February 27–March 3 at the Cajundome at the University of Southwestern Louisiana in Lafayette, Louisiana.

Top-seeded South Alabama defeated hosts  in the championship game, 62–59, to win their fourth overall, and second consecutive, Sun Belt men's basketball tournament.

The Jaguars, in turn, received an automatic bid to the 1998 NCAA tournament. No other Sun Belt members earned bids to the tournament.

Format
No teams left or joined the Sun Belt before the season, leaving conference membership fixed at ten teams.

All teams participated in the tournament, maintaining its ten-team format. With all teams seeded based on regular-season conference records, the top six teams were all placed directly into the quarterfinal round while the four lowest-seeded teams were placed into the preliminary first round.

Bracket

See also
Sun Belt Conference women's basketball tournament

References

Sun Belt Conference men's basketball tournament
Tournament
Sun Belt Conference men's basketball tournament
Sun Belt Conference men's basketball tournament
Sun Belt Conference men's basketball tournament